The Lost EP was a 1985 release by New Zealand band The Chills.
The title came from the fact that the recordings which make up the EP were thought to be lost for some time and the release of the EP was delayed as a result.

All six tracks from the EP were later re-released as part of the Kaleidoscope World compilation CD.

Track listing
"This Is the Way"
"Never Never Go"
"Don't Even Know Her Name"
"Bee Bah Bee Bah Bee Boe"
"Whole Weird World"
"Dream by Dream"

References

1985 EPs
The Chills albums
Flying Nun Records EPs